Koninklijke Sport Vereniging Roeselare, abbreviated to KSV Roeselare,, also known in French as KSV Roulers, was a Belgian football club from the city of Roeselare in West Flanders.  Its matricule was 134. It last played at the highest level of Belgian football from 2005–06 until 2009–10, but finally folded in 2020 after having relegated to the third level and going bankrupt.

History 
The first club of the city was founded in 1900 by some students and named De Verenigde Vrienden (Dutch for The United Friends) but that name changed early to Red Star Roeselare.  In 1902, the club is known as Union Sportive Roulers (in French) but it will retire from the football association for financial problems in 1909.  The next year, two new clubs are founded – Sportvereniging Roeselare (the Catholics) and F.C. Roeselare (the non-Catholics) – but not for long as the former club activity stopped in 1914 due to World War I.  The birth of S.K. Roeselare arose seven years later.   it received the matricule n° 134.   F.C. Roeselare with the matricule n° 286.  However, this matricule does not exist anymore as K.S.K. Roeselare and K.F.C. Roeselare merged in 1999 to form K.S.V. and kept the n° 134.  The first time a team from Roeselare achieved promotion to the first division was in 2005 when K.S.V. won the second division playoff.

Honours 
Belgian Second Division:
Runners-up (1): 2004–05
Belgian Second Division Final Round:
Winners (1): 2005

 
 Belgian First Division B
 Runners-up (1): 2016–17

European record 
As of December, 2008.

Uefa Cup 2006 – 2007
1st qualifier:
FK Vardar Skopje   – KSV Roeselare 1 – 2
KSV Roeselare          – FK Vardar Skopje 5 – 1
2nd qualifier:
KSV Roeselare          – FC Ethnikos Achnas 2 – 1
FC Ethnikos Achnas – KSV Roeselare 5 – 0

Former players 

  Izzet Akgül
  Vadim Dotsenko
  Tom Holmes

References

External links 
 Official Website
 Roeselare at UEFA.COM
 Roeselare at EUFO.DE
 Roeselare at Weltfussball.de
 Roeselare at Football Squads.co.uk
 Roeselare at National Football Teams.com
 Roeselare at Football-Lineups.com

 
Association football clubs established in 1999
Association football clubs disestablished in 2020
Football clubs in Belgium
1999 establishments in Belgium
2020 disestablishments in Belgium
K.S.V. Roeselare
Belgian Pro League clubs